Fritz Mahler (July 16, 1901 in Vienna, Austria – June 18, 1973 in Winston-Salem, North Carolina, U.S.) was an Austrian conductor.

Mahler's father was a cousin of the composer Gustav Mahler. In Europe he became a leading conductor with such ensembles as the Berlin Radio Symphony, the Dresden Philharmonic and the Danish State Symphony. He fled Europe in 1936 for the United States. He was married, from 1939 until his death, to dancer Pauline Koner (b. 1912) and taught at summer sessions of the Juilliard School in New York for many years (advanced conducting, director of the opera department). In 1940-41, he was the city's director of music for the National Youth Administration as well.  Mahler was music director of the Erie Philharmonic from 1947 to 1953 and the Hartford Symphony Orchestra from 1953 to 1962. Koner's memoir "Solitary Song" (Duke University Press, 1989) provides much information about his career available nowhere else.

References 
 

Male conductors (music)
Musicians from Vienna
1901 births
1973 deaths
Fritz
20th-century Austrian composers
20th-century Austrian conductors (music)
20th-century Austrian male musicians
Austrian emigrants to the United States
Juilliard School faculty